James Wootton (1895–1960) was an English footballer who played in the Football League for Port Vale and Nelson shortly after the First World War.

Career
Wootton played as a guest for Walsall during the First World War, before joining Port Vale as a guest amateur in October 1916. After four goals in seventeen games in the war league he was unavailable from March 1917. He had a spell at Leek Alexandra, before re-joining Port Vale in August 1919. The club was readmitted into the Football League for the 1919–20 season, replacing Leeds City. Wootton made 19 Second Division appearances in the season, and was a member of the side that shared the North Staffordshire Infirmary Cup in 1920. He played 25 league and cup games in the 1920–21 season, and scored goals against Hull City and Clapton Orient. He lost his first team place at The Old Recreation Ground in March 1921 and joined Nuneaton Town of the Birmingham League in the summer where "the position of outside-left... [had] given the Nuneaton Town officials considerable anxiety". He went on to play seven league and five cup games for the club. He returned to the Football League with Nelson in January 1922. He played 14 times in the Third Division North for the "Admirals" during the remainder of the 1921–22 season, before moving back into non-league with Hereford United. He went on to play for Rugby Town and Oakengates Town, before ending his career with Walsall Early Closers in August 1932.

Career statistics
Source:

References

Sportspeople from Walsall
English footballers
Association football wingers
Walsall F.C. wartime guest players
Port Vale F.C. wartime guest players
Port Vale F.C. players
Nuneaton Borough F.C. players
Nelson F.C. players
Hereford United F.C. players
Rugby Town F.C. players
Oakengates Athletic F.C. players
English Football League players
1895 births
1960 deaths